Ettore Ceresoli (born 11 April 1970) is a retired Italian high jumper.

Biography
He finished eighth at the 1995 World Indoor Championships and tenth at the 1998 European Indoor Championships. He also competed at the 1994 European Indoor Championships without reaching the final. He became Italian high jump champion in 1993 and 1995, rivalling with Roberto Ferrari. He also became indoor champion in 1995 and 1998.

His personal best jump is 2.26 metres, achieved in September 1995 in Rome. He had 2.28 metres on the indoor track, achieved at the 1995 World Indoor Championships in Barcelona, he has 11 caps in national team from 1992 to 1998.

Achievements

National titles
Ettore Ceresoli has won 3 times the individual national championship.
2 wins in High jump (1993, 1995)
2 wins in High jump indoor (1995, 1998)

See also
 High jump winners of Italian Athletics Championships

References

External links
 

1970 births
Living people
Italian male high jumpers